Vaea is a Polynesian surname and male given name, derived from that of Mount Vaea on Upolu island, Samoa.

Surname
Notable people with this surname include:
 ʻAlipate Tuʻivanuavou Vaea (born 1957), Tongan politician and nobleman
 Baron Vaea (1921–2009), Tongan politician
 Baroness Tuputupu Vaea, Tongan noblewoman and royal
 Ita Vaea (born 1989), Tongan rugby union player
 Mathew Vaea (born 1966), Samoan rugby union player

Given name
Notable people with this given name include:
 Vaea Anitoni (born 1970), American rugby union footballer
 Vaea Falemaka (born 1985), Tongan rugby league player
 Vaea Fifita (born 1992), Tongan-born New Zealand rugby union player